The term Field of Mars goes back to antiquity, and designates an area, inside or near a city, used as a parade or exercise ground by the military.

Notable examples of places which were used for these purposes include:
 Campus Martius, an area in ancient Rome
 Champ de Mars, a large public space in front of the Military Academy in Paris
 Field of Mars (Saint Petersburg), a square in Saint Petersburg

Modern-day examples of places which have been given this name include:
 Campo Marte, a venue for military, government and equestrian events in Mexico City
 Field of Mars Reserve, bushland in New South Wales, Australia
 Pedion tou Areos, a large public park in Athens

See also
Mars (disambiguation)
Champ de Mars (disambiguation)
Campus Martius (disambiguation)
Campo Marte (disambiguation)
Marchfield (assembly)
Mars (oil platform), an oil field in the Gulf of Mexico